The 830s decade ran from January 1, 830, to December 31, 839.

Significant people
 Al-Mu'tasim
 Louis the Pious
 Egbert of Wessex
 Ansgar
 Wiglaf of Mercia
 Turgesius

References

Sources